"Everyday Formula" is a song by Australian rock band Regurgitator. The song was released in October 1997 as the lead single from the band's second studio album Unit. The single peaked at number 41 in Australia and it also ranked at number 19 on Triple J's Hottest 100 in 1997.
 
In 2019, Tyler Jenke from The Brag ranked Regurgitator's best songs, with "Everyday Formula" coming it at number 4. Jenke said "Like most songs by the Gurge, the exceptional, catchy music hides some lyrics underneath that usually go missed by casual fans of the band. In this case, 'Everyday Formula' sees the group describing environmental issues being overlooked due to the rise of technology. Truly, they were ahead of their time."

Music video

The song's music video is heavily inspired by the 1982 film Tron and recreates several scenes from the film. The music video sees frontman Quan Yeomans being digitised by a laser and transported into a computer world where he is forced to compete in the ball game from the film.

Track listings

Charts

Release history

References

 

1997 singles
1997 songs
Regurgitator songs
Songs written by Quan Yeomans
Song recordings produced by Magoo (Australian producer)
Warner Music Australasia singles
Environmental songs